Deep is an album by jazz pianist Junior Mance which was released on the JSP label in 1980.

Reception

The Allmusic site awarded the album 3 stars calling it a "a patented blend of soul jazz, blues, and mainstream fare" and stating: "Mance reflects the influence of Ahmad Jamal in his phrasing and solos, but works in the Gene Harris school, eschewing fancy statements and intricate progressions for more bluesy, funky lines".

Track listing
 "9:20 Special" (Earle Warren, Jack Palmer, William Engvick) 
 "Georgia on My Mind" (Hoagy Carmichael, Stuart Gorrell) 
 "Small Fry" (Carmichael, Frank Loesser) 
 "In the Evening" (Leroy Carr, Don Raye) 
 "I Want a Little Girl" (Murray Mencher, Billy Moll) 
 "Deep" (Junior Mance)
 "Ease on Down the Road" (Charlie Smalls)
 "Smokey Blues" (Mance)

Personnel
Junior Mance - piano 
Martin Rivera - bass
Walter Bolden - drums

References

1980 albums
Junior Mance albums
JSP Records albums